Lustrocomus paraensis is a species of beetle in the family Cerambycidae, and the only species in the genus Lustrocomus. It was described by Martins and Galileo in 1996.

References

Calliini
Beetles described in 1996
Monotypic beetle genera